Trametes gibbosa, commonly known as the lumpy bracket, is a polypore mushroom that causes white rot. It is found on beech stumps and the dead wood of other hardwood species. Fruit bodies are 8–15 cm in diameter and semicircular in shape. The upper surface is usually gray or white, but may be greenish in older specimens due to algal growth. Elongated pores are located on the under-surface. The fruiting bodies are frequently attacked by boring beetle larvae.

See also
List of Trametes species

References

Fungal tree pathogens and diseases
Polyporaceae
Fungi of Europe
Fungi described in 1836
Taxa named by Christiaan Hendrik Persoon
Taxa named by Elias Magnus Fries
Fungi described in 1795